Joseph Parsons Comegys (December 29, 1813February 1, 1893) was an American judge, lawyer and politician from Dover, in Kent County, Delaware. He was a member of the Whig Party and later the Democratic Party, who served in the Delaware General Assembly, as a U.S. Senator from Delaware, and later as the chief justice of the Delaware Supreme Court.

Early life and family
Comegys was born at "Cherbourg," in Kent County, Delaware, near Dover, the son of former Governor Cornelius P. Comegys and Ruhamah Marim. He attended the old academy at Dover, studied law with John M. Clayton, was admitted to the bar in 1835 and commenced practice in Dover. He married Clayton's niece, Margaret A. Douglass and had three children.

Professional and political career
Comegys was elected as a member of the State House twice, and served in the 1843/44 and 1849/50 sessions. He was also a member of the commission to revise the State Constitution in 1852. On November 19, 1856, he was appointed to the U.S. Senate, to fill the vacancy caused by the death of John M. Clayton. He did not run again, and served until January 14, 1857, when his successor was elected. After many years in private practice he was appointed chief justice of the State Supreme Court on May 18, 1876 and served until January 26, 1893, just before his death.

Death and legacy
Comegys died at Dover and is buried there in the Old Presbyterian Cemetery, on the grounds of the Delaware State Museum.

References

Images
Biographical Directory of the United States Congress; portrait courtesy of the Library of Congress.

Almanac
Elections are held the first Tuesday after November 1. Members of the Delaware General Assembly took office the first Tuesday of January. State Representatives have a two-year term. The General Assembly chose the U.S. Senators, who took office March 4 for a six-year term. They also chose the delegates to the Constitutional Convention of 1852.

External links
Biographical Directory of the United States Congress
Delaware’s Members of Congress

The Political Graveyard

1813 births
1893 deaths
People from Dover, Delaware
Delaware lawyers
Delaware Whigs
19th-century American politicians
Delaware Democrats
Members of the Delaware House of Representatives
United States senators from Delaware
Chief Justices of Delaware
Burials in Dover, Delaware
Whig Party United States senators
19th-century American judges
19th-century American lawyers